The Cestos River, also known as Nuon or Nipoué river, is a Liberian river that rises in the Nimba Range of Guinea and flows south along the Côte d'Ivoire border, then southwest through tracks of Liberian rain forest to empty into a bay on the Atlantic Ocean where the city River Cess is located.  The pygmy hippopotamus (Choeropsis liberiensis) is known to inhabit lands along stretches of the river. It forms the northern third of the international boundary between Liberia and Côte d'Ivoire.

During the First Liberian Civil War, the portion of the river near the city of Cestos was a leading food and mineral extraction region for the National Patriotic Front of Liberia.

References

Rivers of Liberia
Rivers of Guinea
Rivers of Ivory Coast
International rivers of Africa
Ivory Coast–Liberia border
Border rivers